William Carey Mathes (December 17, 1899 – July 24, 1967) was a United States district judge of the United States District Court for the Southern District of California.

Education and career

Born in Hale Center, Texas, Mathes received a B.B.A. degree from the University of Texas at Austin in 1921 and a Bachelor of Laws from Harvard Law School in 1924. He was in private practice in Los Angeles, California from 1924 to 1945.

Federal judicial service

On September 24, 1945, Mathes was nominated by President Harry S. Truman to a seat on the United States District Court for the Southern District of California vacated by Judge Ralph E. Jenney. Mathes was confirmed by the United States Senate on October 11, 1945, and received his commission on October 17, 1945. He was a member of the Judicial Conference of the United States from 1958 to 1960. He served as Chief Judge from 1964 to 1965, assuming senior status on June 9, 1965. Mathes served in that capacity until his death on July 24, 1967.

Notable case

Mathes was the trial judge in the case of Kawakita v. United States, which eventually went before the Supreme Court of the United States.

Note

References

Sources
 
https://www.tshaonline.org/handbook/entries/mathes-william-carey-jr

1899 births
1967 deaths
University of Texas at Austin alumni
Harvard Law School alumni
Judges of the United States District Court for the Southern District of California
United States district court judges appointed by Harry S. Truman
20th-century American judges
People from Hale County, Texas